Mamprusi may refer to:
 Mamprusi people
 Mamprusi language